A Sight for Sore Eyes may refer to:

 A Sight for Sore Eyes (film), a 2005 short film
 A Sight for Sore Eyes (novel), a 1999 novel by crime-writer Ruth Rendell
 "A Sight for Sore Eyes", a 1977 song by Tom Waits